8 South African Infantry Battalion is a mechanized infantry unit of the South African Army. The battalion is equipped with Ratel Infantry Fighting Vehicles (IFV) used for fast transport and combat mobility across rough ground. Support weapons for mechanized infantry are also provided with motorized transport, or are built directly into these IFVs, in order to keep pace with the IFVs in combat. The battalion was raised at Upington in the Northern Cape in 1973 as part of the South African Infantry Corps, and since the change in structure, has been assigned to the Infantry Formation.

8 SAI continues to train for conventional warfare and forms part of the annual brigade-level Lohatla Army Battle School exercise. Training includes IFV-mounted and dismounted fire-and-move drills, and integration with Engineers, Armour, Artillery and Air Force elements.

History

Activation
The unit was established at Upington in the Northern Cape in October 1973 and received its first batch of national service trainees the next January. They could, however, not cope with the Gordonia heat and the unit afterwards received trainees in July.(1986 Intake was in January. 1987 Intake was in February) The base for its first decade consisted mainly of tents, in 1979 the harsh conditions of extreme desert heat and dust storms coupled with limited facilities led to 111 national servicemen from Alpha Company going on AWOL. A resultant Board of Inquiry led to the Base being vastly upgraded in the following years.

Motorised Infantry
In its first decade 8 SAI was a motorised Infantry battalion. The Battalion primarily deployed with Buffel APCs at that stage.

Battalion Storm Pioneer Platoon
8 SAI had a storm/assault pioneer capability in the 1980s, usually designated Oscar Company. Assault pioneers were the integral combat engineering component of the battalion. Assault pioneers were trained in tasks such as:

 Field defences and obstacles,
 Mine detection and removal,
 Primary demolitions,
 Non standard bridging,
 Anchorages and suspension traverses

The Pioneer Platoon provided small tasks and close support capabilities to the battalion ensuring immediacy of response and decreasing the workload of the engineer squadrons. By the 1990s this function was retired to the Engineering Corps however.

Battalion Tactical Reconnaissance Platoon
8 SAI experimented with the tactical reconnaissance platoon concept for infantry units around 1981-1982 at Riemvasmaak. These abbreviated pathfinder/reconnaissance courses were given by the SA Special Forces to certain SADF units. A nickname given for this training was the "junior recce" course.

Mechanised infantry
By 1976 infantry operations were being transformed drastically when the Ratel Infantry Fighting Vehicle (IFV) was introduced for the first time and in November the first Ratel course was presented at 1 SAI. 
Similar to 1 SAI, 8 SAI was transformed into a mechanised unit by the mid 1980s and mechanised leaders followed a similar training route.

All students attended the course until the  Section Leaders Phase had been completed. Section Leaders were then awarded their Lance Corporal stripes and then placed with regular rifle companies. The rest of the future NCOs also received their stripes and future Officers received their white Candidate Officer's tabs. These students were then evaluated and split into the Mechanised Platoon Commanders Course and Specialist Instructors Course.
These platoon commanders were destined to either become future leaders of 8 SAIs rifle companies or instructors at the Training Wing, while the Specialist Instructors would become Officers and NCO's responsible for training of Ratel gunners and drivers.  
All students qualifying as Section Leaders were authorised to wear one parallel yellow bar above their two Corporal stripes. 
Students that qualified as Platoon NCOs were authorised to wear two parallel yellow bars. The Platoon NCOs were responsible for the support of the vehicles, guns and signal equipment of a specific platoon. 
Students that completed either the Platoon Commanders or Specialist Instructors Course were permitted to wear three parallel yellow bars above their stripes, signifying their platoon sergeant status. Platoon sergeants were responsible for the training and discipline of an allocated platoon.

The Border War/Angolan Civil War

Between 1979 and 1989, 8 SAI participated in the Border War. 8 SAI directly contributed troops to the following operations:

 Operation Savannah (1975), 8 SAI and 5 SAI companies relieve 2 SAI from Battle Group Beaver.
 Operation Reindeer (1979), attack on Cassinga, Southern Angola,
 (1979-1980) Supply troops with 6 SAI through Madimbo in the Limpopo Valley into Rhodesia to protect farming communities in the south of that country from ZANLA infiltration.
 Operation Sceptic (1980), destroy control and logistic structures at Chifufua, Southern Angola,
 Operation Carrot (1981), counter insurgency warfare in the farming districts of Tsumeb, Otavi and Grootfontein, in Sector 30, Namibia,
 Operation Protea (1981), destroy SWAPO command and training center at Xangongo and logistic bases at Xangongo and Ongiva. Southern Angola
 Operation Daisy (1981), attack on SWAPO center at Chitequeta, Southern Angola
 Operation Yahoo (1982), mobile skirmishes countering SWAPO infiltration in SWA in the Ogandjere tribal area, north of the Etosha pans and the Bakenkop farm. 55 insurgents killed and 16 apprehended. 1 Ratel lost by concentrated RPG fire.
 Operation Meebos (1982), attack SWAPO bases identified by reconnaissance teams, Southern Angola
 Operation Phoenix (1983), counter offensive to SWAPO infiltration into Owamboland, Namibia, 309 SWAPO killed.
 Operation Dolfyn (1983), attack PLAN bases and headquarters around the Angolan town of Cuvelai
 Operation Askari (1983/4), disrupt logistical support and command & control capabilities of PLAN to suppress an incursion planned for Jan 1984.
 Operation Pronkertjie (1985),
 Operation Viper (1985),
 Operation Benzine (1986),

Bases in South West Africa
Elements of 8 SAI was seconded to routine operations during this period to the following bases:
 Mahanene
 Rundu
 Okalongo
 Oshigambo
 Etale
 Ondangwa
 Tsintsabis
 Okongo
 Ogongo
 Ombalantu

Battle surrounding Cuito Cuanavale

 Operation Moduler (1987), Lead up to the Battle of Cuito Cuanavale
 Operation Hooper (1988), Part of the Battle of Cuito Cuanavale

Attack on Calueque Dam
The Cubans opened a second front on 27 June 1988 against the South Africans and launched a ground offensive in the direction of Calueque Dam in Southern Angola. The area to the north of the dam became the scene of fighting. MiG-23 aircraft attacked the facilities, bombing a bridge, sluice gates, a pump, a generator, and a pipeline to Ovamboland in three waves. 7 soldiers from 8 SAI and 4 from 1 SSB/10 Armoured Squadron lost their lives in this engagement.
 Operation Excite/Hilti (1988), Draw Cubans out of Techipa, Southern Angola and ambush, preventing an advance to Calueque and SWA/Namibian border.
 Operation Linger (1988)

8 SAI and 63 Mech

By 1989, 8 SAI had also become a feeder unit for 63 Mechanised Battalion Group, part of 60 Brigade.
 Operation Merlyn (1989). Prevent the incursion of PLAN (SWAPO) insurgents into South West Africa/Namibia in contravention of ceasefire effected 1 April 1989.
 Operation Agree 8 SAI infantry companies as part of 63 Mechanised Battalion Group, was part of the last contingent of South African troops to withdraw from Namibia at independence in 1989-1990 in accordance with the United Nations Security Council Resolution 435 handing over responsibility to the United Nations Transition Assistance Group (UNTAG).

Citizen Force secondment
After a national serviceman's time had ended with 8 SAI, the vast majority were eventually assigned to Citizen Force Mech Regiments such as Regiment de la Rey, Regiment Northern Transvaal and the Cape Town Highlanders.

South Africa internal operations
From 1990, the unit deployed internally in South Africa. Its main tasks at this time included counter insurgency in urban and rural areas.  In late 2019 the unit was reportedly deployed in a number of communities in Cape Town to combat gang violence by supporting police operations.

Since 1994
In June 1994, the unit received its SANDF Colours, the first presented to a unit in the new South African National Defence Force.

Amalgamation with 61 Mech

In 2006, 61 Mechanised Infantry Battalion Group was disbanded and most of its members and mechanised equipment were transferred to 8 SAI.

8 SAI's main training area, at Riemvasmaak, north of Upington, was transferred to a civilian community. Since then 8 SAI uses the SA Army Combat Training Centre at Lohatla as its main training area.

Peacekeeping
 Operation Curriculum, 2001-2009, 8 SAI companies were involved in peacekeeping operations for the African Union in Burundi
 Operation Mistral, 2003, 8 SAI companies were involved in peacekeeping operations for the African Union in the Democratic Republic of the Congo.
 Operation Cordite, 2006, 8 SAI companies were involved in peacekeeping operations for the African Union in the Darfur, Sudan 
 Operation Triton in the Comores oversaw an African Union Mission to stabilise that country's elections. This was strengthened by a company from 8 SAI.

8 SAI was again redeployed to the Democratic Republic of Congo as part of Operation Mistral under the auspices of MONUSCO from December 2009 to May 2010 and from November 2011 to June 2012.

8 SAI Mechanised Fleet early 1990s

Alpha or attack vehicles

1 Ratel 20 per section, 3 sections per platoon, 3 platoons per company.
1 Ratel command per platoon, 4 per company.

Charlie or support vehicles

Ordnance

Current

Vehicle mounted weapons
8 SAI is equipped with Ratel 20 Infantry Fighting Vehicles, Ratel  Mortar Platform Vehicles, Ratel Command Vehicles with mounted  machine guns, Ratel 90s and Ratel 81s, Kwevoel 100 Armoured Trucks for IFV Recovery, field maintenance, fuel bunkers and water provision, Samil 50 and 100 logistics trucks, Samil 20 trucks for its organic field workshops, Casspir APCs for its forward artillery observation party, and Rinkhals Field Ambulances. 8 SAI has also used Buffel IFVs and Mambas at various stages in its history. Ratel mounted weapons include the Denel Land Systems GI-2  Quick Firing Cannon (QFC) (Ratel mounted),  breech-loading mortar (Ratel mounted), Browning M1919 Machine gun and the Browning M2  Machine gun.

Small-arms
8 SAI is equipped with the:
 Vektor SS77 Squad Automatic Machine gun, 
 Fabrique Nationale  Light Machine gun, 
 Vektor R4  (.223 NATO) assault rifle,  
 Multiple Grenade Launcher (MGL), 
 Rocket Propelled grenade launcher (RPG-7), 
 M26 Fragmentation grenade, 
 M1/M4  patrol mortar (PATMOR), and the Denel 
 FT5 rocket launcher.

Future
Under Project Hoefyster, the SANDF will eventually replace the Ratel family of vehicles with the Badger system.

Nine versions are contemplated of which three are earmarked for mechanized infantry battalions such as 8 SAI:

 Command (turreted  MG for self-defence, multiple radios and command post equipment) 
 Mortar (turreted  breech loading long-range mortar) 
 Missile (turreted Denel ZT3 Ingwe)
 Section (turreted  cannon)
 Fire Support (turreted  cannon, but with more ammunition than the section vehicle)
 Signal variant
 Ambulance variant
 Artillery variant

Insignia

Previous Dress Insignia

Current Dress Insignia

Unit song
Ou Kalahari Wysie
Ver in die Noord-Kaapse duineveld waar gemsbokke nog baljaar,
Daar word 'n seun tot 'n vegter wat leer om sy land te bewaar
Selfs deur die snikhete somer en deur die winter kou,
Leer ons en werk ons en veg ons want ons land is ons hoogste trou.

Ver in die Noord-Kaapse duineveld weg van die stad se gewoel,
Daar leer die manne van 8 SAI te streef na die hoogste doel,
Onder die vry-bloue hemel en ongerepte natuur,
Toon ons ons ware karakter, wys ons ons krag en vuur.

Battle honours

Leadership

Training Battalion

Operational Battalion

Notes

References

Infantry battalions of South Africa
Military units and formations established in 1973
Military units and formations of South Africa in the Border War
Infantry regiments of South Africa